Karina Perez (born September 14, 1970 in Belo Horizonte, Minas Gerais, Brazil) is a former Brazilian actress.

She stood out as the jealous and uncontrolled columnist Andreia Sampaio in Mulheres de Areia, as Lilian in Tropicaliente and, in 1997, as Rose de Por Amor. She left the career of actress and currently is dedicated to the plastic arts and to its children.

Career

Television

References

External links

1970 births
Living people
Brazilian telenovela actresses
People from Belo Horizonte